Caroline LeRoy Webster (September 28, 1797 – February 26, 1882) was the second wife of 19th century statesman Daniel Webster.

Early life
She was a daughter of Hannah (née Cornell) LeRoy and Herman LeRoy. Her father was once head of the commercial house of Leroy, Bayard, McKiven & Co., a large trading company that operated in different parts of the world. Herman also served as the first Dutch Consul to the United States. 

A descendant of Thomas Cornell, Caroline's maternal grandfather, the Loyalist Samuel Cornell, was the last Royal Attorney General of North Carolina.  Her aunt, Elizabeth Cornell, was married to banker William Bayard Jr., a close friend to Alexander Hamilton, and her first cousin, Harriet Elizabeth Bayard, was married to Stephen Van Rensselaer IV, the last patroon of the Manor of Rensselaerswyck.

Personal life
She was the second wife of Daniel Webster, after Grace Fletcher Webster's death. She met Webster at her father's house while Webster was a guest there. After only a few months of courtship they were married. Their wedding was an upscale one with a large and fashionable assemblage.

In 1839, she traveled to Europe with Webster, during this time she was a guest of Queen Victoria and the Duke of Wellington as well as other members of the British government and the British aristocracy.

When Daniel Webster died in 1852, Caroline received $100,000 which was invested for her benefit.  Thirty years later after Daniel Webster's death, Caroline LeRoy Webster died in her home in New York City after increasing illness and pneumonia. She died on February 26, 1882, in her bed. She was then buried in Woodlawn Cemetery in New York.

See also
 List of people from New York City

References

External links

 Daniel Webster and Caroline Webster papers at Harvard Library.

1797 births
1882 deaths
American people of Dutch descent
Burials at Woodlawn Cemetery (Bronx, New York)
Cornell family
People from New York City
Spouses of Massachusetts politicians